Brave New World is a role-playing game originally released by Pinnacle Entertainment Group in 1999. The game was sold to Alderac Entertainment Group in 2000. The game is an alternate history superhero game set in a fascist United States of America living in a perpetual state of martial law since the 1960s. Inspired by the Kingdom Come and Batman: The Dark Knight Returns comic storylines, X-Men, Nineteen Eighty-Four, and the political and social upheavals of the 1990s, the game depicts renegade superheroes fighting a corrupt and evil government.

The game debuted at the 1999 Gen Con Game Fair in Milwaukee.

Development
Matt Forbeck left Pinnacle Entertainment Group to move to Alderac Entertainment Group just before the two companies ended their relationship, and sold his Brave New World role-playing game to AEG.

Alternate history

Deltas
While the history of the Brave New World setting actually diverged from real history in antiquity, the first point of divergence known to the general public was in the trenches of World War I, when a dying soldier discovered he had the power to turn incorporeal. He became the Silver Ghost, the first superhero, a secret spy for the War Department who helped end the Great War months early.

He was the first, but soon after the war many other super-powered humans started to appear. Nobody knew from where, but people who were in mortal danger would sometimes begin to manifest superhuman powers. In the early days, in the 1920s and 1930s, most of these new heroes didn't bother to wear disguises, and the government and people were fairly accepting of their vigilante methods. There were super-powered villains appearing, but heroes were always there to keep them in check. This was analogous to the Golden Age of Comic Books. Fairly quickly, scientists began to refer to these super-powered beings as "Homo Delta" or "Deltas", meaning change. Mankind didn't know what these new people were, only that something had changed about them.

Then, in the late 1930s, one superhero named "Yankee" was officially deputized as a law enforcement officer by the city of Chicago. Wearing a brightly colored, red, white and blue outfit, he worked with Eliot Ness to bring down Al Capone, and became a powerful role model for other superheroes.

Alphas
On December 7, 1941, the US Navy base at Pearl Harbor was destroyed by Imperial Japanese Navy fighters alongside military Deltas. The Third Reich and Imperial Japan had their own Deltas as weapons of war, alongside traditional weapons. The United States was drawn into World War II. Delta Squadron was founded to be the super-powered arm of the United States. America had super soldiers who fought on the battlefields, and some were as strong as entire tanks, or as deadly in the skies as fighters and bombers.

In the fall of 1943, the Yankee was captured along with his young sidekick Sparky. They were taken to a concentration camp to be imprisoned and eventually disposed of, as the Nazis considered Delta soldiers, and Deltas who refused to serve the Reich, too dangerous to be kept alive indefinitely like normal prisoners of war. However, after almost two years of torture and interrogation, Yankee and Sparky staged their revolt. At first it seemed like the Yankee and Sparky, along with all the other Deltas, were killed in the resulting battle, but as the Nazis threw the Yankee and Sparky's bodies into the ovens to be incinerated, something incredible happened: out of the charnal fires of the ovens came Superior, the most powerful superhuman ever born.

Sparky had somehow come back to life, and come back far more powerful. He was apparently virtually immune to guns, could move at incredible speed, and was as strong as thousands of men. He rescued the Yankee and two other Deltas from the ovens just in time. Then, in a matter of moments, he killed every Nazi at the camp. The Nazi's own Delta guard, Kaptian Krieg, received the distress call, and came to put down what he thought was another Delta uprising, only to be torn limb from limb by Superior. With his incredible new superpowers, he flew to Berlin, fought his way into the bunker of Adolf Hitler, killed him, and then flew across the world to force the surrender of Emperor Hirohito. In only a few hours, he brought the Second World War to a complete end.

The Cold War began in the aftermath, much like in the real world. The United States did not develop nuclear weapons for several more years (they didn't need to finish them, as Superior's early victory in the war meant the Manhattan Project was canceled late in development). However, the real arms race was in the new "Alpha" class super-humans. A handful of other "Alphas" emerged at the end of the war, and in the aftermath, and the Soviet Union was able to "create" several new Alphas, none as powerful as Superior, but still enough to challenge him. In 1949 they also detonated an atomic bomb, and the Cold War began in earnest. Even Superior was uncertain he could survive a nuclear blast. The United States quickly finished its own nuclear program, and like the real world, the fear and paranoia of the Cold War gripped the nation. Senator Joseph McCarthy held his HUAC hearings, but the moral superiority of a Delta hero named Patriot eventually shamed him into closing them.

Forced registration
The largest divergent point in this alternate history was November 22, 1963. In Brave New World, like in the real world, John F. Kennedy was the subject of an assassination attempt. However, in Brave New World, apparently Kennedy survived the assassination due to the intervention of Superior. Instead of sniper fire, in this world, Lee Harvey Oswald was one of several super-villains in power armor who flew in and destroyed the President's limousine with energy weapons. Superior managed to save the life of the President, but in the aftermath the government decided it must take a much harsher line on dealing with super-humans. The Delta Registration Act was quickly passed by Congress, making it a federal offense worthy of life imprisonment to not register superpowers with the government within seven days of manifesting them. Furthermore, all super-humans essentially had no civil rights, and could be used by the government in any way it felt appropriate. The government created Delta Prime as a super-powered law enforcement agency to control unregistered Deltas. Witch hunts begin to flush out super-humans who had not registered.

In these troubled times, a group of heroes emerged to fight for freedom and civil rights. Calling themselves the "Defiance", they were a loosely organized resistance group that opposed having to register their superpowers. Portrayed as domestic terrorists by the government, they were a thorn in the side of the government for decades. In 1966, a battle between Delta Prime forces and the super-villain Devastator (who was responsible for the assassination attempt on Kennedy) ended up with Devastator escaping (although his entire tower in New York City along with four square blocks were destroyed) and thousands of lives being lost. In the aftermath of this, Kennedy declared martial law throughout the country. Stoking fears of Delta terrorists, he was establishing himself as President For Life, ignoring the Constitution, and keeping the people in control by manipulating their fears. He considered everything from the Congress to the Supreme Court of the United States to be merely "advisory" bodies; he would take advice from them, but he would make all the decisions from now on. Protected by a Secret Service detachment of Delta Prime, enforcing his will through hearings and secret trials that made HUAC look "like a Girl Scout meeting", and extrajudicial executions of many prisoners, the United States quickly became a neo-fascist nightmare. A super-powered prison, the "Fortress", a secret supermax prison enhanced with super-science and magic was built somewhere in Nebraska to house Delta and Alpha enemies of the state.

Disappearance of Alphas
Then, on July 4, 1976, in many ways, things got even worse. The "Bicentennial Battle" erupted in downtown Chicago, as a showdown between the Devastator, his minions and allies, and Superior and the forces of Delta Prime. Devastator threatened to detonate a mysterious "doomsday bomb" on top of the Sears Tower unless Superior surrendered to him. Of course, Superior would never surrender, but in the middle of the battle, Devastator set off the bomb. In that moment, the entire world changed. Everything within  of the Sears Tower vanished without a trace. Buildings, people, plants, everything was gone. A shallow crater was even gouged into the earth, which Lake Michigan immediately flowed into, creating "Chicago Bay". However, at that moment, every Alpha, everywhere on Earth, vanished. Millions of people died, an entire city was destroyed, and the Alpha superheroes, including Superior, which had been America's greatest defender for 30 years, had vanished. Over the next few years, Crescent City would be built on the shores of Chicago Bay (named for the crescent shape it takes when seen from above). The center of superpowered activity on Earth, it would be the headquarters of both Delta Prime and the Defiance.

Without Superior and other Alpha superheroes to keep the world relatively calm, global politics collapsed quickly. The Defiance movement (as well as Delta super-villains) were emboldened to act, since they didn't have the mighty Superior to fear, leaving many American cities scarred and blasted from super-powered conflicts. Many nations of the world broke down into open war. The Iron Curtain never fell, instead, in 1988 when the Soviet Union started to dissolve, a bloody military coup restored communist power, and the CIA decided that the General who initiated the coup had to die. The lowest point was in 1989, after the nuclear meltdown at Chernobyl, sabotaged by American Deltas, when a limited nuclear war between the US and USSR broke out. By the time calmer heads prevailed, Atlanta and San Francisco had been destroyed by Soviet nuclear weapons, while the US had destroyed Kyiv and Minsk. The public was told it was an unprovoked first strike, and that the events in Chernobyl were a terrible accident wrongfully blamed on the USA.

The Defiance reached its greatest strength after that point, as the development of the Internet in the 1990s made it much easier for Deltas to stay in contact and organize. Secret, encrypted web pages, email, and offshore data havens helped the Defiance movement grow from a loose group of malcontents into a much larger and more organized movement. Kennedy would love to shut down the Internet, but it is too useful for commerce, and the sagging economy of the US needs all the help it can get.

Outside the United States, 1990 to present
 In 1996, Nelson Mandela was murdered, ending any chance of a peaceful settlement of apartheid in South Africa, where racial order is enforced by superhuman powers.
 Australia is actually quite open and hospitable to Deltas, and is one of the few havens in the world where they are treated as equal citizens, assuming they can make it to Australian soil to claim the offer.
 Canada has its own laws requiring registration of Deltas, but they are nowhere near as harsh as American laws.
 China is strangely shorthanded with Deltas, compared to other countries, for reasons nobody quite understands. Fearing that the United Kingdom would not return Hong Kong, they staged a military invasion of the island in 1998, which still was ongoing as of the 1999 date of the books.
 The European Union never formed, and Europe is a fractious, contentious continent of heavily armed police states, although Norway and Sweden are also havens for Deltas.
 Iraq invaded Kuwait in 1990, but the world was too busy to expel the Iraqi invaders, so Saddam Hussein is slowly building an empire of his own in the Middle East.
 The city of Madras in India was destroyed by a nuclear weapon, although it could never be proven it was from Pakistan, so a nuclear war was avoided, barely.
 In the aftermath of the Bicentennial Battle, the Emperor of Japan reasserted his power, reasserted his divinity, renounced pacifism, and began to rebuild the Japanese Empire, and the rest of the world had too many problems to be able to stop him.
 The Soviet Union still goes strong, with a government which is seemingly immune to coup attempts (with coup or assassination attempts happening frequently).

Game system
The game system of Brave New World was based on a simplified version of the rules system developed by Pinnacle Entertainment Group earlier in 1996 for Deadlands. Brave New World eschewed the use of poker cards and poker chips, and only used six-sided dice instead of the many polyhedrals of Deadlands. Superpowers were represented as specific "power packages" of thematic powers grouped together, such as "flyer", "speedster" or "blaster" (similar systems of archetypes are found in other superhero games, like City of Heroes).

The Brave New World books were mostly black & white, with small glossy color sections that would give exposition about the setting and plot, and very important information, like new power packages.

The back of each book contained a "Guide's Handbook", which was information specifically for use by the game master, such as some of the secrets of the setting (see below).

The game was published from 1999 until early 2001, when AEG cancelled the line. Author Matt Forbeck has revealed on his web site the general plans for the game when it was canceled, and the direction it was going to take. A coming expansion would feature Superior reappearing in the skies of Crescent City, wounded and exhausted, but alive, and with him would be revealed the truth behind what really happened to him, all the Alphas, the City of Chicago, and eventually reveal where Alphas and Deltas got their powers, and other mysteries of the setting.

Matt Forbeck has stated his interest in returning to produce new Brave New World materials, possibly in PDF format, but acknowledges the legal and licensing issues that may make such a project very difficult. However, in 2009, Alderac have released all of the Brave New World books in PDF through DriveThruRPG.

Secrets of the setting

Brave New World books always were intentionally vague about some parts of the setting, implying that there were mysteries that the general public (and player characters) would not know about. The truth to these elements was revealed in the "Guide's Handbook" part of each book. Elements of the setting that were planned, but never published, were revealed on the author's web site in 2004, providing a much clearer picture of the Brave New World setting.

The most important secret was that President Kennedy was dead. He really was killed by assassins in 1963. The man who calls himself John F. Kennedy is actually "Facade", an Alpha shapeshifter who Superior convinced to temporarily impersonate the President to allow for a more orderly transfer of office. Facade was not about to give up the most powerful office in the world so lightly, though.

Famous Defiance martyr "Patriot", supposedly executed by the government, was secretly rescued by the Defiance and living in hiding, with the Defiance unwilling to reveal he was alive and lose a powerful martyr, and the government being unwilling to admit that one of their biggest enemies was forcibly rescued from New Alcatraz.

The reason that the USSR did not fall and that coups have failed is that the Premier is a Delta himself, with superhuman healing as his power.  Whenever he is poisoned or shot, he recovers within moments.  China actually does have as many Deltas as other nations, but it keeps their existence a closely guarded secret, preserving an illusion of scarcity.

Alphas and Deltas got their power from being descended from extra-dimensional entities. In other universes, the laws of physics were different, allowing beings to fly, or shoot beams of energy, or be incredibly strong. When they traveled from universe to universe, they were sometimes mistaken for gods, like they were on Earth. They interbred with the native humans, before being chased away by mysterious "multiversal police" who were an order of being far more powerful, "Omegas", who were as far above Alphas as Alphas were from Deltas. The Multiversal police considered it a serious crime to visit universes that did not natively have superpowers, as it seriously damages the fabric of reality to use superpowers in a world that isn't able to support them.

Thus, the gods and monsters of legend and the angels and devils of religions were real, and are not around anymore because they were chased away by other powerful beings. However, most of mankind is descended, however distantly, from at least one of these beings. Most humans have the raw genetic potential to be Deltas and Alphas, but never get the chance. Only the greatest stress could trigger the subconscious to actually use Delta powers, and the same stresses could turn a Delta into an Alpha. While Delta powers were not natural to Earth, their use was not very injurious to the universe. However, mighty Alpha powers were beginning to slowly destroy the world. If something was not done, the world would be destroyed fairly soon.

The Multiversal Police returned to Earth, and spoke with Facade (impersonating President Kennedy), explaining the real nature of their powers and the danger their world was in, and they made a deal with him. They provided Facade with a device which would eliminate most of the Alphas and prevent Earth's entire universe from collapsing. This device was handed over to Devastator, being told it was a doomsday bomb, which he activated during the Bicentennial Battle.

At the moment the bomb was activated, every Alpha on Earth who was not specially protected (such as being in a special prison) was teleported to a specially prepared pocket dimension, along with everything within  of the bomb (the Chicago metropolitan area). Thus, the entire city of Chicago, along with almost all the Alphas on Earth, were imprisoned in a pocket universe, seemingly forever. It was intended for Superior, aided by a quarter century of work by every Alpha formerly on Earth, to escape, and for the truth about Facade, the Multiversal Police, the source of Delta powers to be revealed, and for heroes from Earth to be able to explore other universes, but that book, "Crossroads", never got to be published.

Reviews
Pyramid

References
 
 
 
 Author Matt Forbeck's Notes on the Brave New World game

Specific

Superhero role-playing games
Alternate history role-playing games
Pinnacle Entertainment Group games
Alderac Entertainment Group games
Role-playing games introduced in 1999
Apartheid in fiction
Cultural depictions of John F. Kennedy
Dystopian fiction